Naica is a town in the Mexican state of Chihuahua. It is located in the municipality of  Saucillo.  As of 2010, the town of Naica had a population of 4,938, up from 4,775 in the 2005 INEGI Census. 

It is a mining town and the location of the renowned Naica Mine.

See also
Cave of the Crystals

References

Populated places in Chihuahua (state)
Populated places established in 1828